The 1940 Ohio gubernatorial election was held on November 5, 1940. Incumbent Republican John W. Bricker defeated Democratic nominee Martin L. Davey with 55.55% of the vote.

Primary elections
Primary elections were held on May 14, 1940.

Democratic primary

Candidates
Martin L. Davey, former Governor
George White, former Governor
William J. Kennedy
Herbert S. Duffy, former Ohio Attorney General
Harold G. Mosier, former U.S. Representative
James F. Flynn	
Frank A. Dye

Results

Republican primary

Candidates
John W. Bricker, incumbent Governor

Results

General election

Candidates
John W. Bricker, Republican 
Martin L. Davey, Democratic

Results

References

1940
Ohio
Gubernatorial